= Boeing Model 320 =

Flying boat

General information
- Type: Patrol Flying boat
- National origin: United States
- Manufacturer: Boeing Airplane Company
- Status: Concept

The Boeing Model 320 was a late 1930s project by Boeing for a giant maritime patrol flying boat.

== Design ==
The design of the Boeing Model 320 featured a giant flying boat with twin hulls. The crew of eight was seated in a nacelle in the wing center section.

== Specifications ==
- Crew: 8
- Wingspan: 200 feet
- Powerplant: Six 1,200 hp Wright R-2600 Twin Cyclone engines.
- Length: 116 ft
- Gross weight: 134,000 lb
